A significant severe weather event impacted the South Central United States between October 20–22, 2019. Forecasters first identified the threat on October 16 as a large upper-level trough was expected to combine with an unstable atmosphere across Texas, Oklahoma, and Arkansas particularly. On the evening of October 20, discrete supercell thunderstorms developed across the Dallas–Fort Worth metroplex, contributing to several tornadoes. One of those tornadoes caused EF3 damage in the Dallas suburbs, becoming the costliest tornado event in Texas history, at $1.55 billion. A later squall line contributed to additional tornadoes and a widespread swath of damaging winds as the system tracked eastward.

Meteorological synopsis
The first signs of organized severe weather across the South Central United States came on October 16, when the Storm Prediction Center (SPC) first delineated a risk area across portions of northern Texas, eastern Oklahoma, and adjacent portions of Kansas, Missouri, and Arkansas. In their day 3 outlook on October 18, the organization introduced a broad Marginal risk for much of the same areas. A small Slight risk was added across northeastern Texas, southeastern Oklahoma, and western Arkansas on October 19, but as confidence in a higher-end event increased, these same areas were raised to an Enhanced risk. In advance of the outbreak, the SPC monitored several weather features of interest. In the upper levels of the atmosphere, an upper-level trough was expected to amplify as it progressed eastward into the U.S. Plains, providing increasing wind shear throughout the region. Simultaneously, a low-pressure area and associated cold front were anticipated to shift eastward across an unstable environment, leading to the formation of severe thunderstorms. Forecasters noted that while the overall environment supported the potential for significant (EF2+) tornadoes, questions about whether storms would be supercellular or instead evolve into a quasi-linear convective system prevented the addition a significant risk area. By the late afternoon hours of October 20, thunderstorms began to develop across eastern Oklahoma within a rapidly moistening environment. At 7:58 p.m. CDT, the first tornado watch was issued across the Ark-La-Tex region; several more watches were introduced over subsequent hours. A pair of long-tracked supercells developed across Tarrant and Johnson counties, intersecting a very unstable regime and producing significant tornadoes as a result. A squall line formed along the cold front farther west, producing a wide swath of damaging winds and additional tornadoes as it tracked across the South-Central United States.

Confirmed tornadoes

Northern Dallas–Richardson, Texas

At 8:58 p.m. CDT on October 20, a tornado began in Dallas County, Texas, near the interaction of Spur 348 and Luna Road, snapping large tree limbs. The tornado moved east-northeast across Interstate 35E quickly reaching high-end EF2 strength. A strip mall was severely damaged, sustaining roof loss and collapse of multiple exterior walls. Several other retail businesses were also damaged in this area. Along Walnut Hill Lane, a multi-story apartment complex and a commercial building had their roofs ripped off, and also sustained loss of some exterior walls. Numerous homes, along with churches and gas station also sustained heavy damage in this area. Maintaining EF2 strength, the tornado moved across Marsh Lane and through areas east, heavily damaging Cary Middle School and Thomas Jefferson High School. The tornado produced a mixture of EF1 and EF2 damage as it moved through residential neighborhoods to the northeast of this area, downing numerous trees, and causing moderate to significant damage to many houses. Dozens of homes along this portion of the path had their roofs torn off, several of which sustained some failure of exterior walls. The most intense pocket of damage occurred along Northaven Road, where one well-built brick home had its roof torn off, and sustained collapse of most exterior walls. Given the degree of damage, damage surveyors assigned low-end EF3 damage to that home; this was the only EF3 damage point assigned along the path of the tornado. The tornado then shifted to a more northerly course as it crossed US 75 between Forest Lane and Royal Lane, where several businesses, including a car dealership, a Home Depot, and office low-rise buildings, suffered EF2 damage. It crossed the Texas Instruments campus, still on a northeasterly course, causing mainly EF1 damage. The tornado then crossed I-635 at the Greenville Avenue/TI Boulevard exit, still heading northeast. At an apartment complex near Walnut Street and Greenville Avenue, dozens of units had sections of roof missing. The nearby Cutters Point apartment complex was also affected, with significant roof loss consistent with EF2 damage. A low-rise office building at the northeast corner of Walnut St and Abrams Rd. had numerous windows blown out. Many homes in Richardson north of Richland College also suffered EF2 damage before the tornado began to weaken. Widespread tree and roof damage consistent with an EF1 tornado was observed across the Richland Park, Lakes of Buckingham, Richland Meadows, and College Park subdivisions. A few homes had their roofs blown off at high-end EF1 intensity. The weakening tornado then curved sharply to the north, continuing into the Huffhines Park area. Damage along this portion of the path consisted of minor damage to homes, along with numerous trees and tree limbs downed. Weakening further to EF0 strength, the tornado decreased in width and finally dissipated while crossing Jupiter Road. Additionally, the tornado caused about $1.55 billion in damage, making it the costliest tornado event in Texas history.

Impact
Around 8:00 a.m. the next morning, approximately 242,000 people were without power. Six schools in the Dallas ISD cancelled classes on October 21, including Thomas Jefferson High School. Many roads into Dallas were closed due to fallen trees and power lines. The EF3 tornado passed near the home of former President George W. Bush, but no damage was done to the house.

In other parts of the DFW-Metroplex, the storms dumped heavy rain & hail across the area as well as lit up the skies with non-stop lightning.

See also
 List of North American tornadoes and tornado outbreaks
 List of United States tornadoes from September to October 2019

Notes

References

Tornadoes in Oklahoma
2019 in Oklahoma
Tornadoes in Texas
2019 in Texas
Tornadoes in Arkansas
2019 in Arkansas
Tornadoes in Tennessee
2019 in Tennessee
Tornadoes in Alabama
2019 in Alabama
Tornadoes in Louisiana
2019 in Louisiana
Tornadoes in Mississippi
2019 in Mississippi
Tornadoes in North Carolina
2019 in North Carolina
October 2019 events in the United States
2019 natural disasters in the United States
Tornadoes of 2019
F3 tornadoes